Hated may refer to:

 Hated (2012 film), an American film directed by Lee Madsen
 Hated: GG Allin and the Murder Junkies, a 1993 music documentary film
 "Hated", a song by Beartooth from Aggressive

See also
 Hate (disambiguation)